Tiverton Rural District was a rural district within the county of Devon. It was abolished in 1974 and succeeded by Mid Devon District Council.

References

Districts of England abolished by the Local Government Act 1972
Rural districts of England
History of Devon